Tubenose may refer to:

 Birds in the order Procellariiformes.
 Fishes in the family Aulorhynchidae.
 Aulichthys japonicus, a fish in the family Hypoptychidae

Animal common name disambiguation pages